Hansjörg Gerhard Georg Müller (born 30 April 1968) is a German politician. Born in Treuchtlingen, Bavaria, he represents Alternative for Germany (AfD). Hansjörg Müller has served as a member of the Bundestag from the state of Bavaria since 2017.

Life 
He became member of the Bundestag after the 2017 German federal election. He is a member of the Committee for Economics and Energy.

References

External links 

  
 Bundestag biography 

1968 births
Living people
Members of the Bundestag for Bavaria
Members of the Bundestag 2017–2021
Members of the Bundestag for the Alternative for Germany
People from Treuchtlingen